Sarem Saqlu (also Romanized as Sārem Sāqlū; also known as Qahremān Kandī and Sārem Sākhlū) is a village in Avajiq-e Shomali Rural District, Dashtaki District, Chaldoran County, West Azerbaijan Province, Iran. At the 2006 census, its population was 85, in 18 families.

References 

Populated places in Chaldoran County